Stefanos Kotsolis (born 5 June 1979) is a Greek former professional footballer who played as a goalkeeper.

Club career

Panathinaikos
Born in Athens, Kotsolis joined Panathinaikos as an 18-year-old youth player in 1997 and made sporadic appearances over his first five seasons at Panathinaikos. The imposing form of first-choice keeper Antonios Nikopolidis and the presence of Józef Wandzik, Kostas Chalkias and Mario Galinović kept Kotsolis most of that time at the bench. He made his professional debut for Panathinaikos on 13 April 1999, in a Greek Cup game against Athinaikos.

AEL
In 2005, Kotsolis was transferred to AEL where he made a total of 121 appearances, playing there until June 2009. During season 2006/2007, he won the Greek Cup after beating his former club Panathinaikos at the final.

Omonia
He was then transferred to Cypriot club Omonia, from where he was released in summer 2010. Here he won Cypriot First Division and the LTV Super Cup.

Return to Panathinaikos
On 8 February 2011 he returned to Panathinaikos after five and a half years of absence from the team. On 23 July 2013, he renewed his contract for 2 more years. On 26 April 2014 Kotsolis won his third Greek Cup playing at the final against PAOK.

Kotsolis was released by Panathinaikos after the end of 2016–17 season.

International career
He is a former Greece under-21 international and team captain at the 2002 UEFA European Under-21 Football Championship. He is also a senior international with Greece, making 5 appearances since 2005.

Career statistics

(* Includes UEFA Europa League and UEFA Champions League)
(** Includes Super League Play-offs )

Honours
Panathinaikos
Alpha Ethniki: 2003–04
Greek Cup: 2003–04, 2013–14

AEL
Greek Cup: 2006–07

Omonia
Cypriot First Division: 2009–10
LTV Super Cup: 2010

References

External links
 Official Website Of Stefanos Kotsolis
 Profile at Onsports.gr

Living people
1979 births
Greece international footballers
Greece under-21 international footballers
Super League Greece players
Cypriot First Division players
Panathinaikos F.C. players
Athlitiki Enosi Larissa F.C. players
AC Omonia players
Association football goalkeepers
Footballers from Athens
Greek footballers
Greek expatriate sportspeople in Cyprus
Greek expatriate footballers
Expatriate footballers in Cyprus